HMPS may be:

 His Majesty's Prison Service, of the United Kingdom
 Hansraj Morarji Public School, in Andheri, Mumbai